Legislative elections were held in Adjara, an autonomous republic within Georgia, on 8 October 2016. Adjara elected its 18-member parliament, Supreme Council, in the region's 7th local legislative election since Georgia declared independence from the Soviet Union in 1991.

Background
The 21-member Supreme Council of Adjara is elected for a 4-year term. Six of its members are elected through the majoritarian contest in single-mandate constituencies and the remaining 15 seats are filled through the proportional contest from those parties or blocs which clear a 5% threshold.

Results
The election was held simultaneously with the nationwide parliamentary election on 8 October 2016. The ruling Georgian Dream party received 45.13% of votes in the proportional, party-list contest, followed by the opposition United National Movement party with 29.62%, Nino Burjanadze's Democratic Movement with 5.89%, and the Alliance of Patriots of Georgia with 5.7%, winning respectively eight, five, one and one seat each. A majoritarian election in Adjara's all six single-mandate constituencies went into run-off on 30 October 2016, which were won by the Georgian Dream candidates, securing a 14-seat majority in the Supreme Council of Adjara.

References

Adjara
Elections in Adjara
Adjara
History of Adjara